Spoiled Children (Spanish: Hijos de papá) is a 1980 Spanish comedy film directed by Rafael Gil and starring Irene Gutiérrez Caba, José Bódalo and .

Cast

References

External links

1980 comedy films
Spanish comedy films
Films directed by Rafael Gil
Films scored by Gregorio García Segura
1980s Spanish-language films
1980s Spanish films